Trevylyan Napier (1867–1920) was a Royal Navy vice admiral. Admiral Napier may also refer to:

Alexander Napier (2nd Laird of Merchiston) (died c. 1474), Vice-Admiral of Scotland
Charles Napier (Royal Navy officer) (1786–1860), British Royal Navy admiral
William Napier (Royal Navy officer) (1877–1951), British Royal Navy admiral